Hydrelia musculata is a moth in the family Geometridae first described by Otto Staudinger in 1897. It is found in Russia.

References

Moths described in 1897
Asthenini
Moths of Asia